The Surinam golden-eyed tree frog (Trachycephalus coriaceus) is a species of frog in the family Hylidae found in Bolivia, Brazil, Ecuador, French Guiana, Peru, Suriname, and possibly Colombia.
Its natural habitat is subtropical or tropical moist lowland forests. It is threatened by habitat loss.

References

Trachycephalus
Amphibians described in 1867
Taxa named by Wilhelm Peters
Taxonomy articles created by Polbot